Anton Plenikowski (19 November 1899 – 3 March 1971) was a German communist politician of the Free City of Danzig and East Germany.

Biography 
Plenikowski was born in Zoppot, then a German town on the country's "North Sea" coast.   He served in the German Army in World War I and became a member of the Soldier's and Workers' council of Breslau in 1918. After the war he worked as a teacher in Zoppot.  He was a member of the municipal parliament of Liessau (1925–28) and the district parliament of Landkreis Großer Werder (1926–1930). In 1926 he joined the Social Democratic Party of the Free City of Danzig and the Communist Party in 1927. He represented the Communist Party in the Volkstag parliament in 1928-1937, at times as leader of the Communist group in it. He was dismissed from public service in 1933. After the ban on the Communist Party on 28 May 1934 by the Nazi Government, it continued to run in the 1935 Volkstag elections as "List Plenikowski".

In 1937 he emigrated to Sweden. In 1940-1941 he was detained at the Smedsbo prison camp. After his release, he settled down in Uppsala. From 1943 onwards he was involved in the Stockholm branch of the KPD. Plenikowski returned to Germany in 1946. He joined the Socialist Unity Party of Germany (SED) and worked in various positions in the SED administration. Plenikowski was a member of the Volkskammer in 1950-1967, candidate to the Central Committee of the SED (1954–1967) and head of the office of the council of ministers (1956–1963).

Plenikowski died in Berlin.

References 

1899 births
1971 deaths
People from Sopot
People from West Prussia
Social Democratic Party of Germany politicians
Communist Party of Germany politicians
Candidate members of the Central Committee of the Socialist Unity Party of Germany
Members of the Provisional Volkskammer
Members of the 1st Volkskammer
Members of the 2nd Volkskammer
Members of the 3rd Volkskammer
Members of the 4th Volkskammer
German Army personnel of World War I
Free City of Danzig politicians
German expatriates in Sweden
Recipients of the Patriotic Order of Merit in gold
Recipients of the Banner of Labor